Kuo Zing-yang (or Z. Y. Kuo; ; 1898–1970), was a  Chinese experimental and physiological psychologist. He was a renowned educator and is also notable as having been the President of Zhejiang University, who was expelled by Zhejiang students in 1935.

Biography
Kuo was born in Shantou, Guangdong Province in 1898. Kuo studied at Fudan University in Shanghai. In 1918, Kuo went to study in the United States. In 1923, Kuo obtained his PhD from the University of California, Berkeley (UC, Berkeley) at age 25.

Kuo went back to China, and founded the Department of Psychology at Fudan University in 1924. Kuo was a professor, the Vice-president; and from Apr 1924 to Nov 1925, the acting President of Fudan University. From 1927 to 1936, Kuo taught at National Central University and Zhejiang University. From 1933 to 1936, Kuo was the President of Zhejiang University, and did the most important research of his academic career - about animal's behavior epigenetics.

In Dec 1935, the December 9th Movement broke out, which led to a large student strike in Zhejiang University. There were some severe conflicts between Kuo and some students and faculty, and Kuo was described as "autocratic" in the handling this incident. Chiang Kai-shek then intervened, leading to Kuo's resignation from his university president position.

From 1936 to 1945, Kuo was a visiting scholar to United States, and did research and lectured in several American universities. Kuo was a visiting professor of UC Berkeley, Yale University and the University of Rochester, and a researcher at Carnegie Institution in Washington, D.C..

From 1946 to 1970, Kuo resided in Kowloon, Hong Kong. Kuo was a trustee of the University of Hong Kong. Kuo died in Hong Kong on 14 August 1970 at age 72.

Works
 Chapter 3: From Watsonian Behaviorism to Behavior Epigenetics (by Zing-Yang Kuo).
 Book: The Dynamics of Behavior Development: An Epigenetic View; by Gilbert Gottlieb, Zing-Yang Kuo; June 1976.
 Book: The Dynamics of Behavior Development; by Zing-Yang Kuo; Random House Press, 1967.
 Book: Instinct;1961. Princeton, NJ:Van Nostrand.

Extra materials
 "To be a big shot or to be shot": Zing-Yang Kuo’s other career (by Geoffrey H. Blowers, University of Hong Kong, Hong Kong)
(Using the above link will provide a new link "content.pdf" that you can use to see the full text of the article.)
 History of Psychology - Abstract
 Zing-Yang Kuo (biography)
 Robert Epstein: Comparative Psychology as the Praxist Views It; Journal of Comparative Psychology. Vol 101(3), Sep 1987, 249-253.
 Gottlieb, G. (1972): Zing-Yang Kuo: Radical scientific philosopher and innovative experimentalist (1898–1970); Journal of Comparative and Physiological Psychology, 80, 1-10.

References

External links
 Presidents of Zhejiang University - Zing-Yang Kuo
 中国乃至世界心理学史上 一个显赫的名字郭任远 (A notable name in the history of psychology - Zing-Yang Kuo)
 Zing-Yang Kuo's brief biography from Southeast University

1898 births
1970 deaths
Academic staff of the University of Hong Kong
Fudan University alumni
People from Chaoyang District, Shantou
Chinese psychologists
Hong Kong psychologists
University of California, Berkeley alumni
Academic staff of Zhejiang University
Educators from Guangdong
Presidents of Zhejiang University
20th-century psychologists